Thomas Loizides (born 2 August 1988) in London, England is an English-born Greek            Cypriot rugby player who plays for the Cyprus national rugby union team and has done since 2011. He also plays for the English club Esher RFC. He joined the club in July 2008 after leaving the Saracens.

He plays at Wing, but played at Centre when he was younger. Loizides attended Wellington College, Berkshire.

References

External links 
Cyprus Rugby Federation
Itsrugby profile
Statbunker profile

1988 births
Living people
Cypriot rugby union players
English rugby union players
English people of Greek Cypriot descent
London Irish players
Rugby union centres
Rugby union players from London